Ride This Night (Swedish:Rid i natt) is a 1941 Swedish novel by Vilhelm Moberg.

It may also refer to:

 Ride Tonight!, a 1942 Swedish film directed by Gustaf Molander based on the novel
 Ride This Night (TV series), a 1985 Swedish television series